Luciano Foti (Messina, 1694–1779) was an Italian painter of the Baroque era.

Biography
He was known as an excellent restorer, a skill much in demand in the earthquake prone Sicilian city. He also survived the onslaught of the plague in Messina in 1743, which decimated the artist community. He made many Renaissance-style paintings based on designs of Polidoro da Caravaggio.

References

1694 births
1779 deaths
Painters from Messina
18th-century Italian painters
Italian male painters
Italian Baroque painters
18th-century Italian male artists